Continental Greece (formerly , Chérsos Ellás), colloquially known as Roúmeli (Ρούμελη), is a traditional geographic region of Greece. In English, the area is usually called Central Greece, but the equivalent Greek term (Κεντρική Ελλάδα, Kentrikí Elláda) is more rarely used.

It includes the southern part of the Greek mainland (sans the Peloponnese), as well as the offshore island of Euboea. Since 1987, its territory has been divided among the administrative regions of Central Greece and Attica, and the regional unit (former prefecture) of Aetolia-Acarnania in the administrative region of Western Greece.

Etymology

The region has traditionally been known as Roúmeli (Ρούμελη), a name deriving from the Turkish word Rūm-eli, meaning "the land of the Rūm [the Romans, i.e. the Byzantine Greeks]" and originally encompassing all of the Ottoman Empire's European possessions. The official name Stereá Elláda ("Continental" or "Mainland" Greece), derives from the juxtaposition with the Peloponnese peninsula across the Corinthian Gulf, and the fact that these two territories formed the independent First Hellenic Republic after the Greek War of Independence (1821–1829).

Geography

It is located to the north of the Peloponnese and to the south of Thessaly and Epirus,  bordering the Aegean Sea to the east, the Ionian Sea to the west and the Corinthian Gulf to the south. Its climate is temperate along its coastlines, and dry in the interior.

Mountains
The region is one of the most mountainous in Greece, having some of the highest elevations in the country.

Lakes
Central Greece also has some of the largest lakes in Greece; among the most important is Mornos lake in Phocis, which supplies water to Phocis, parts of Phthiotis, Boeotia, and Athens as well.

Rivers

Some important and well-known rivers of Central Greece are the Acheloos in Aetolia-Acarnania, which is the second longest of the country, the Spercheios in Phthiotis, the Evenus in Aetolia-Acarnania, and the Mornos in Phocis.

Cities

The principal cities of the region of Central Greece according to the census of 2001 are:

Athens
3,130,841 (Athens urban area)
3,761,810 (Athens metropolitan area)
Lamia
58,601
Agrinio
57,147
Chalkida
53,584
Thebes
21,211
Livadeia
20,061

Culture

Roumelian music and dances
Roumelian dances tend to be slow and controlled. The clarinet is the main instrument in this region. The main dances of this region are tsamikos (in which the leader performs energetic leaps) and kleftiko, both influenced by the Arvanites of the region.

Gallery

External links
 ΕΛΛΗΝΙΚΗ ΔΗΜΟΚΡΑΤΙΑ - ΠΕΡΙΦΕΡΕΙΑ ΣΤΕΡΕΑΣ ΕΛΛΑΔΑΣ 

Central Greece
Traditional geographic divisions of Greece